Scorpiodoras is a genus of thorny catfishes native to tropical South America.

Species
There are currently two described species in this genus:
 Scorpiodoras heckelii (Kner, 1855)
 Scorpiodoras liophysus Sousa & Birindelli, 2011

References
 

Doradidae
Fish of South America
Taxa named by Carl H. Eigenmann
Catfish genera
Freshwater fish genera